François Vannson (born 20 October 1962 in Épinal) was a member of the National Assembly of France.  He represented the Vosges department from 1993 to 2017 as a member of the Union for a Popular Movement.

References

1962 births
Living people
People from Épinal
Rally for the Republic politicians
Union for a Popular Movement politicians
The Popular Right
Deputies of the 12th National Assembly of the French Fifth Republic
Deputies of the 13th National Assembly of the French Fifth Republic
Deputies of the 14th National Assembly of the French Fifth Republic